Shut Up 'n Play Yer Guitar, a project consisting of Shut Up 'n Play Yer Guitar, Shut Up 'n Play Yer Guitar Some More and Return of the Son of Shut Up 'n Play Yer Guitar, is a series of albums by Frank Zappa. The albums consist solely of electric guitar instrumentals and improvised solos played by Zappa and featuring a wide variety of backing musicians. 

The music was well received by critics, and Zappa subsequently produced additional albums focusing solely on guitar-oriented instrumental music.

The albums were initially released as individual LPs in May 1981 on Barking Pumpkin Records and sold only through mail order in the United States. The recordings were subsequently reissued as a triple album box set in 1982 and distributed by CBS Records in Europe. The complete package later appeared as a two CD set.

Background 
After the release of Joe's Garage, Frank Zappa set up his home studio, the Utility Muffin Research Kitchen, and planned to release a triple LP live album called Warts and All. As this project neared completion, Zappa found it to be "unwieldy" due to its length. Zappa later conceived the Shut Up 'N Play Yer Guitar series, which contained two tracks originally prepared for Warts and All.

Content 
The music is entirely instrumental but interspersed with brief bits of comic dialogue from Zappa band members. More of these bits appear on other Zappa albums such as Läther. 

Most solos come from live performances. The three title tracks are all derived from the song "Inca Roads"; various other solos were taken from "Conehead", "Easy Meat", "The Illinois Enema Bandit", "City of Tiny Lites", "Black Napkins", "The Torture Never Stops", "Chunga's Revenge", and "A Pound for a Brown on the Bus". "Ship Ahoy" was the coda from a performance of "Zoot Allures" the first part of which appears on  You Can't Do That on Stage Anymore, Vol. 3.

The final track, "Canard du Jour", is a duet with Frank Zappa on electric bouzouki and Jean-Luc Ponty on baritone violin dating from a 1972 studio session.

Some of the solos from these albums are featured in written form in The Frank Zappa Guitar Book.

Reception 

Reviewing the album's double CD incarnation in a retrospective assessment for AllMusic, Sean Westergaard wrote, "Frank Zappa [...] was one of the finest and most under appreciated guitarists around. [...]  This is an album that should be heard by anyone who's into guitar playing." Another writer for the website, Lindsay Planer, similarly appraised the individual releases Shut Up 'n Play Yer Guitar Some More and Return of the Son of Shut Up 'n Play Yer Guitar, writing of Some More, "it is certainly a wonderful place for interested parties to commence their discovery of the (dare say) many moods Zappa imbued in carefully constructed yet thoroughly improvised compositions such as the seven found here." In regard to Return of the Son, Planer wrote that Zappa "saved some of his best offerings [...] Zappa pours his expansive ideas onto the soundscape with a certainty and purpose that is simply unmatched in terms of passion and inspiration."

Legacy 
Zappa later released similar recordings including Guitar (1988) and Trance-Fusion, released posthumously (2006). Additionally, Zappa assembled the compilation The Guitar World According to Frank Zappa for Guitar World magazine. In 1997, Dweezil Zappa assembled another compilation of Zappa's guitar-based songs and solos, Frank Zappa Plays the Music of Frank Zappa: A Memorial Tribute.

Track listing
All tracks written by Frank Zappa except "Canard du Jour" which was improvised by Zappa and Jean-Luc Ponty

Shut Up 'n Play Yer Guitar

Shut Up 'n Play Yer Guitar Some More

Return of the Son of Shut Up 'n Play Yer Guitar

Personnel 
 Frank Zappa – Lead Guitar (all tracks except 20), Bouzouki (track 20)
 Denny Walley – Rhythm Guitar (tracks 1, 3, 5, 9, 12, 13, 16, 18)
 Ray White – Rhythm Guitar (tracks 2, 6–8, 14, 15, 17)
 Ike Willis – Rhythm Guitar (tracks 1–3, 5–9, 12, 13, 15–19)
 Steve Vai – Rhythm Guitar (tracks 2, 6–8, 15, 17)
 Warren Cuccurullo – Rhythm Guitar (tracks 1, 3, 4, 9, 12, 13, 16, 18, 19), Electric Sitar (tracks 5, 10)
 Jean-Luc Ponty – Baritone Violin (track 20)
 Tommy Mars – Keyboards (tracks 1–3, 5–9, 12, 13, 15–18)
 Bob Harris – Keyboards (tracks 2, 6–8, 15, 16)
 Peter Wolf – Keyboards (tracks 1, 3, 5, 9, 12, 13, 16, 18)
 Andre Lewis – Keyboards (track 11)
 Eddie Jobson – Keyboards (track 14)
 Patrick O'Hearn – Bass (tracks 10, 14,), Dialogue
 Arthur Barrow – Bass (tracks 1–3, 5–9, 12, 13, 15–18)
 Roy Estrada – Bass (track 11)
 Vinnie Colaiuta – Drums (all tracks except 11, 14, 20)
 Terry Bozzio – Drums, (tracks 11, 14), dialogue
 Ed Mann – Percussion (tracks 1, 3, 5, 9, 12, 13, 16, 18)

Production
 Frank Zappa – Arranger, Composer, Conductor, Producer
 Kerry McNabb – Engineer
 Steve Nye – Engineer
 Jo Hansch – Mastering
 John Swenson – Liner Notes
 John Livzey – Photography
 John Vince – Graphic Design
 Bob Stone – Remixing
 Joe Chiccarelli – Engineer, Mixing (Berkley Theatre)
 George Douglas – Live Recording Engineer, UMRK Mobile
 Tom Flye – Engineer
 Mick Glossop – Engineer

References

1981 live albums
Albums produced by Frank Zappa
Barking Pumpkin Records albums
Frank Zappa live albums